The eighth season of the American reality series Bar Rescue premiered on May 2, 2021 on Paramount Network.

The majority of the bars were filmed in Las Vegas, Nevada. The theme of the eighth season was to save an industry in a city affected by the COVID-19 pandemic. The pandemic also meant that filming, recon, training, and stress tests were altered according to local guidelines.

Experts
Jon Taffer – Host/Star/Bar Consultant

Chefs

Anthony Lamas
Jason Santos
Jen Murphy
Tiffany Derry
Vic Vegas
Kevin Bludso
Michael Ferraro
Chris Oh

Mixologists
Nancy Santiago
Phil Wills
Rob Floyd
Mia Mastroianni
Emily Yett
Derrick Turner
Nick Ortega
Chantel Anderson

Episodes

Notes

References

External links

 

 Bar Rescue Updates — Unaffiliated site that keeps track of bars being open or closed and has updates for each bar

2021 American television seasons
2022 American television seasons
Bar Rescue
Television shows about the COVID-19 pandemic